The 1995 Orange Bowl was a college football bowl game played on January 1, 1995, as the 61st edition of the Orange Bowl and the national championship game for the 1994 season. It featured the Nebraska Cornhuskers of the Big Eight and the Miami Hurricanes of the Big East. The game was a rematch of the historic 1984 Orange Bowl.  As of 2020, the 1995 Orange Bowl holds the record for Orange Bowl attendance at 81,753.

Although this was the Bowl Coalition's National Championship Game, it was a match-up of the first and third-ranked teams in the country, as second-ranked Penn State was obligated to play in the 1995 Rose Bowl as the Big Ten champion.

Teams

Nebraska Cornhuskers

Nebraska came into the game with a 12–0 record and No. 1 ranking in the AP Poll.

Miami Hurricanes

Miami entered the game with 10–1 record and had the AP's No. 3 ranking.

Game summary
Miami placekicker Dane Prewitt scored the first points of the game with a 44-yard field goal to open up a 3–0 Miami lead. Miami quarterback Frank Costa fired a 35-yard touchdown pass to Trent Jones for a 10–0 Miami lead. Nebraska quarterback Brook Berringer threw a 19-yard touchdown pass to tight end Mark Gilman before halftime, to close the deficit to 10–7. In the third quarter, Costa threw a 44-yard touchdown pass to Jonathan Harris, to open a 17–7 lead.

Nebraska outside linebacker Dwayne Harris sacked Costa in the end zone for a safety before the end of the third quarter, and Miami led 17–9. Fullback Cory Schlesinger scored on a 15-yard touchdown run in the fourth quarter to trim the lead to 17–15. Tommie Frazier then found tight end Eric Alford in the back of the end zone to tie the game, 17–17. A 14-yard touchdown run by Schlesinger gave Nebraska a 24–17 lead, and the defense held on to win the national championship.

Scoring summary

Aftermath
Nebraska finished the season with a 13–0 record, and won the national championship (Tom Osborne's first title as a head coach and third overall).  Miami finished the season ranked sixth, with a 10–2 record. It was Nebraska's first bowl win since the 1987 Sugar Bowl.

Second-ranked and also undefeated Penn State won its bowl game (the 1995 Rose Bowl), which led to much controversy after only Nebraska was crowned national champions. It was not until the Bowl Championship Series (BCS) was formed in 1998 that the Big Ten and Pac-10 would allow their champions to compete in national championship games outside the Rose Bowl Game.

Less than two weeks after the game, Dennis Erickson departed the Hurricanes to take the head coaching position with the National Football League's Seattle Seahawks. Miami hired Dallas Cowboys defensive coordinator Butch Davis as Erickson's successor.

References

Orange Bowl
Orange Bowl
Miami Hurricanes football bowl games
Nebraska Cornhuskers football bowl games
Bowl Coalition
January 1995 sports events in the United States
1995 in sports in Florida